Elliotomyia is a genus in the family of Hummingbirds.

Species
The genus contains two species:
White-bellied hummingbird, Elliotomyia chionogaster
Green-and-white hummingbird, Elliotomyia viridicauda

These species were formerly placed in the genus Amazilia. A molecular phylogenetic study published in 2014 found that Amazilia was polyphyletic. In the revised classification to create monophyletic genera, the white-bellied hummingbird and the green-and-white hummingbird were placed in a new genus Elliotomyia.

References

Elliotomyia
Bird genera